The 2012 Bloomington Edge season was the team's seventh season as a professional indoor football franchise and fourth in the Indoor Football League (IFL). One of sixteen teams competing in the IFL for the 2012 season, the Bloomington, Illinois-based Bloomington Edge were members of the United Conference.

Under the leadership of owner Jim Morris, and head coach Kenton Carr, the team played their home games at the U.S. Cellular Coliseum in Bloomington, Illinois.

Schedule
Key:

Regular season
All start times are local time

Postseason

Roster

Standings

References

Bloomington Edge
Bloomington Edge seasons
Bloomington Edge